The 1995 FIFA Women's World Cup Final was a football match that took place at Råsunda Stadium in Stockholm, Sweden on 18 June 1995. It pitted Germany and Norway to determine the winner of the 1995 FIFA Women's World Cup. Norway won 2–0 with goals from Hege Riise and Marianne Pettersen.

Background 
The match was contested by 1991 finalists Norway, who had defeated previous winners the United States, and Germany, who had defeated China in the semi-final.

Route to the final

Match

Details

References

External links 
 1995 FIFA Women's World Cup at Rec.Sport.Soccer Statistics Foundation

Final
1995
1995
 
1995
 
Sports competitions in Solna
June 1995 sports events in Europe